Anton Johansson (born 10 June 2004) is a Swedish ice hockey defenceman for Leksands IF of the Swedish Hockey League (SHL).

Playing career
Johansson made his professional debut for Leksands IF during the 2021–22 season, where he was scoreless in four games. He also appeared in 22 games for Leksands' J20 team where he recorded six goals and four assists, and appeared in 27 games for the J18 team where he recorded seven goals and 15 assists.

Johansson was drafted in the fourth round, 105th overall, by the Detroit Red Wings in the 2022 NHL Entry Draft.

Personal life
Johansson in the son of manager and retired ice hockey player Thomas Johansson, and younger brother of ice hockey player Simon Johansson.

Career statistics

References

External links

2004 births
Living people
Detroit Red Wings draft picks
Ice hockey people from Stockholm
Leksands IF players
Swedish ice hockey defencemen